National Gurdwara is a Sikh gurdwara located in Washington, D.C.

Located on Massachusetts Avenue, the National Gurdwara is the first and only Sikh institution in the capital of the United States.  It is located near the National Cathedral, Naval Observatory and American University.  The gurdwara officially opened in February 2006, and cost over 2 million US dollars.  Along with religious services, Punjabi language classes and kirtan classes are held.

External links
National Gurdwara DC
Washington Post article

Asian-American culture in Washington, D.C.
Gurdwaras in the United States
Religious buildings and structures in Washington, D.C.